Kieran Enda McGowan (1946 – 15 June 2022) was an Irish Gaelic footballer who played at club level with Ballyhaise and at senior inter-county level with the Cavan county team. He usually lined out as a wing-back.

Career
McGowan began his inter-county career at minor level with Leitrim, before having a lengthy career as a member of the Cavan senior team. He won Ulster SFC titles in 1967 and 1969. McGowan also played in the Ulster finals in 1968, 1976, and 1978, the latter as team captain. His achievements with Cavan were acknowledged with his being named as a replacement All-Star, while he also won Railway Cup  medals with Ulster in 1970 and 1971. With his club Ballyhaise, McGowan won a Junior League medal, a Cavan IFC medal and played in the Cavan SFC final in 1978. After his playing days concluded, he was a selector for the Cavan senior team which reached the 1983 Ulster final, but lost out against Donegal.

Death
McGowan died on 15 June 2022, aged 75.

Honours

Ballyhaise
Cavan Intermediate Football Championship: 1968

Cavan
Ulster Senior Football Championship: 1967, 1969
Dr McKenna Cup: 1968

Ulster
Railway Cup: 1970, 1971

References

1946 births
2022 deaths
Cavan inter-county Gaelic footballers
Gaelic football selectors
Irish civil servants
Leitrim Gaelic footballers
Ulster inter-provincial Gaelic footballers
People from Manorhamilton